This is a list of notable events in music that took place in the year 1981.

Specific locations
1981 in British music
1981 in Norwegian music

Specific genres
1981 in country music
1981 in heavy metal music
1981 in hip hop music
1981 in jazz

Events

January–April
January – Nearly a year after the suicide of Ian Curtis, the surviving members of Joy Division plus Gillian Gilbert, now under the name New Order, release their debut single "Ceremony"; the single and its B-side, "In a Lonely Place", are both re-recordings of songs originally written and performed by Curtis. The single's release marks the band's first public use of the "New Order" moniker, which they would retain for the remainder of their career.
10 January – A revival of the Gilbert and Sullivan operetta The Pirates of Penzance opens at Broadway's Uris Theatre, starring Linda Ronstadt and Rex Smith.
11 January - The Country Singer Hank Williams Jr. was released the 32nd album called Rowdy. It has been certified Gold by the RIAA.
18 January – Wendy O. Williams of The Plasmatics is arrested in Milwaukee for simulating masturbation with a sledgehammer on stage. In a scuffle with the police Williams is pinned to the floor and receives a cut above the eye requiring twelve stitches.
24 January – Aerosmith lead singer Steven Tyler is injured in a motorcycle crash that leaves him hospitalized for two months.
9 February – Phil Collins releases his first solo album, Face Value, whose opening track "In the Air Tonight" popularizes the gated reverb drum sound that would become ubiquitous for the next ten years; while the album would end up a smash success, Collins would remain a member of Genesis until 1995.
12 February – Rush release the highly regarded album Moving Pictures which eventually becomes the band's sixth platinum album.
14 February
Ultravox reach number 2 on the UK Singles Chart with "Vienna", but despite huge radio play and massive sales it is subsequently held off the top position for two consecutive weeks by Joe Dolce's novelty song "Shaddup You Face".
Billy Idol leaves the band Generation X to begin a solo career.
25 February – The 23rd Annual Grammy Awards are presented in New York, hosted by Paul Simon. Christopher Cross, with his self-titled debut album and its single "Sailing", becomes the first artist to win all four General Field awards in a single ceremony, controversially beating Pink Floyd's The Wall for Album of the Year.
14 March – Suffering from bleeding ulcers, Eric Clapton is admitted to United Hospital in Saint Paul, Minnesota, USA. Clapton's 60-city tour of the US is cancelled, and he remains in hospital for a month.
21 March – Yellow Magic Orchestra release their fourth studio album, BGM; the album is the first to make use of the Roland TR-808 drum machine, which would go on to become an influential device in both electronic dance music and hip hop music.
27 March – Ozzy Osbourne bites the head off a dove at a CBS record label gathering in Los Angeles.
1 April – The Go-Go's sign to IRS Records.
4 April – British pop group Bucks Fizz wins the 26th Eurovision Song Contest, held at the RDS Simmonscourt Pavilion, Dublin, with the song "Making Your Mind Up".
11 April – Van Halen's lead guitarist Eddie Van Halen marries actress Valerie Bertinelli.
18 April – Yes announce that they are breaking up. (They would reunite frequently in years to come).
20 April – The Mamas & the Papas' John Phillips is sentenced to five years in jail after pleading guilty to drug possession charges. Phillips' sentence would be suspended after thirty days in exchange for 250 hours of community service.
22 April – Eric Clapton is taken to the hospital suffering from bruised ribs and a lacerated shin, following a car accident in Seattle, Washington.
26 April/27 April/28 April – Gary Numan performs three sold out 'farewell concerts' at Wembley Arena, following his announcement to retire from live work at the height of his popularity. (He would return to live performance less than two years later.)
27 April – Ringo Starr and Barbara Bach marry, in London, England.

May–August
2 May – British vocalist Sheena Easton hits No. 1 in the US with "Morning Train (9 to 5)" following a swift rise to fame as the result of a reality TV show.
9 May – Adam and the Ants single "Stand and Deliver" enters the UK Singles Chart at number 1. It remains at number 1 for five consecutive weeks and will sell over one million copies, becoming the years third best selling single in the UK.
14 May – Diana Ross signs with RCA Records (EMI internationally), leaving Motown Records, her label of two decades. The $20,000,000 deal is the most lucrative recording contract in history at that time.
15 May – A riot breaks out at The Ritz rock club in New York when Public Image Ltd plays behind a videoscreen while completely different music plays over the club's speakers.
16 May – Adam and the Ants tops the UK Albums Chart for the tenth consecutive week with Kings of the Wild Frontier.
30 May – A reformed The Human League have their first commercial success as "The Sound of the Crowd" climbs to number 12 on the UK Singles Chart.
4 June – U2 appears on The Tomorrow Show with Tom Snyder, their first U.S. television appearance.
5 June – The TV series Night Flight, a variety show featuring music documentaries and videos, is premiered on the USA Network.
6 June – Kerrang! magazine publishes its first issue. Angus Young of AC/DC is on the cover.
30 June – Jerry Lee Lewis is rushed to hospital in Memphis for emergency surgery for a tear in his stomach. Despite being given less than a 50% chance of survival, he eventually pulls through.
13 July – Duran Duran release the single "Girls on Film". Accompanied by a highly controversial music video that is censored for airplay on MTV and banned by BBC the song becomes the band's first big hit, eventually peaking at number 5 on the UK Singles Chart during an 11 week chart run.
 27 July – Stevie Nicks releases debut solo album Bella Donna, which sold 4 million copies in the US alone.
1 August 
MTV broadcasts for the first time on cable television in the United States, playing music videos 24 hours a day. First to air is "Video Killed the Radio Star" by The Buggles.
The success of Stars On 45 leads to a short-lived medley craze. The most successful imitator of the Stars On 45 format is, rather unexpectedly, the Royal Philharmonic Orchestra, whose "Hooked On Classics (Parts 1&2)" reaches number two in the charts.
15 August - Endless Love - Diana Ross & Lionel Richie recorded the song for Motown, and it was used as the theme for the Franco Zeffirelli's film adaptation of Scott Spencer's novel Endless Love. (Jamie Bernstein, as the character Susan, sings the song during the course of the movie.) Produced by Richie and arranged by Gene Page, it was released as a single from the film's soundtrack in 1981.
23 August – The Violent Femmes are discovered by members of The Pretenders busking outside a Milwaukee venue and are invited to play a 10-minute acoustic set as a second opening act in the Pretenders' show that night.

September–December
5 September – Soft Cell tops the UK Singles Chart with "Tainted Love". The song also tops the chart the following week and becomes the second best selling single in the UK in 1981. 
11 September – Iron Maiden fires lead singer Paul Di'Anno.
19 September 
Simon & Garfunkel perform a free reunion concert in New York City's Central Park attended by over 500,000 fans.
Adam and the Ants have their second chart-topping single of the year as "Prince Charming" reach number 1 on the UK Singles Chart. It remains at number one for four consecutive weeks and becomes the years fourth best selling single in the UK.   
25 September – The Rolling Stones open their US tour in Philadelphia, Pennsylvania.
26 September – Iron Maiden hires Samson lead singer Bruce Bruce AKA Bruce Dickinson to replace Paul Di'Anno. Dickinson will finish off the last 7 dates of the Killer World Tour.
16 October – The Human League release Dare. A huge commercial and critical success, it would spend 69 weeks on the UK Albums Chart including four weeks at number 1 and be certified platinum in the UK, and gold in the US. 
26 October – Iron Maiden plays its first show with Bruce Dickinson as the new lead singer in Bologna, Italy.
27 October – The British Phonographic Industry takes out newspaper ads unveiling its new slogan: "Home Taping Is Killing Music". The ads advocate a levy on blank cassette tapes. 
31 October – Punk band Fear makes a memorable appearance on Saturday Night Live. A group of fans storm the stage and damage TV equipment while moshing, resulting in the show cutting to commercial.
18 November – While sitting in Tom's Restaurant in New York City, Suzanne Vega composes the song "Tom's Diner".
21 November – Orchestral Manoeuvres in the Dark hits number 3 on the UK Albums Chart with their third album Architecture & Morality. Including three UK top-5 singles, "Souvenir", "Joan of Arc" and "Maid of Orleans", it will remain on the chart for 37 weeks and be certified platinum in the UK.
11 December – The Human League reach number one on the UK Singles Chart with Don't You Want Me. The song remains at number one for five consecutive weeks and become the years  best selling single in the UK. 
18 December – An estimated 35 million people around the world watch a live satellite transmission of a Rod Stewart concert at the Los Angeles Forum. It is the first broadcast of its kind since Elvis Presley's "Aloha from Hawaii" special in 1973.
31 December – The tenth annual New Year's Rockin' Eve special airs on ABC, with appearances by Four Tops, Rick Springfield, Barry Manilow, Alabama and Rick James.

Also in 1981
 The organ at the famous Heinävesi Church in Finland is renewed, using locks from the original organ.
 Alice Cooper drastically changes his appearance, leaving behind his trademark make-up and donning a military uniform.
 Synthpop enjoys mainstream popularity in the UK, with groups such as Ultravox, Depeche Mode, Orchestral Manoeuvres in the Dark and The Human League releasing hit singles and albums. The Human League's "Don't You Want Me" and Soft Cell's "Tainted Love" become the years best selling singles in the UK.
 Menudo's golden era (1981–1985) begins in Latin America, parts of Europe and Asia.
 Brad Whitford leaves Aerosmith and is replaced by Rick Dufay.
 Hal Willner "invents" the modern tribute album with Amacord Nino Rota.

Bands formed
See Musical groups established in 1981

Bands disbanded
 Amon Düül II
 Bay City Rollers
 The Buzzcocks (they reform in 1989)
 City Boy
 Cluster (they reform in 1989)
 Generation X
 Klaatu
 The Knack (reformed in 1991, onwards)
 Luv' (they reform in 1989, 1993 and 2005)
 MFSB
 Raydio
 Rockpile
 Sam & Dave
 The Slits
 Starland Vocal Band
 State of Alert
 Steely Dan (They reform in 1993)
 Throbbing Gristle
 Toots & the Maytals (they reform in the early 90s)
 Paul McCartney & Wings

Albums released

January

February

March

April

May

June

July

August

September

October

November

December

Release date unknown

 Adventures in Clubland – Modern Romance
 ¡Alarma!, 1981 album
 Alles ist gut – Deutsch Amerikanische Freundschaft
 The Ascension – Glenn Branca
 Begin the Beguine – Julio Iglesias
 Block to Block – De Press
 B.L.T. – Jack Bruce, Bill Lordan & Robin Trower 
 Breakin' the Chains – Don Dokken
 Catalogue - John Hartford
 Celebration – Johnny Mathis
 Changing Hearts – Polyrock
 Chasanova – Chaz Jankel
 Claro Que Si – Yello
 Classic Rock: Rock Classics – London Symphony Orchestra
 Condition Red - Red Rockers
 Cool Night – Paul Davis
 Corazón de poeta – Jeanette
 Cowboy Jubilee – Riders in the Sky
 Curiosum – Cluster
 Deceit – This Heat
 DEV-O Live – Devo 
 Directions – Miles Davis
 Drama of Exile – Nico
 Earthshaker – Y&T
 Escape Artist – Garland Jeffreys
 The Evil One – Roky Erickson and the Aliens
 Fire Wind – Electric Sun 
 Freelancing – James Blood Ulmer
 Give the People What They Want – Jimmy Cliff
 Hands in the Till – Fortress
 Hits Right Up Your Street – The Shadows
 Individuellos – La Düsseldorf
 Inner City Front – Bruce Cockburn
 Insect and Individual Silenced – Nurse with Wound
 Introducing The Winans - The Winans
 Is This a Cool World or What? – Karla DeVito
 Jane Siberry – Jane Siberry
 Jealousy - Nitty Gritty Dirt Band
 The Judgement of Paris – Kevin Dunn and the Regiment of Women
 Kiss Me Deadly – Generation X as Gen X
 La voce del Padrone – Franco Battiato
 Let Them Eat Jellybeans! – Various Artists from Alternative Tentacles Records
 Living in a Fog – Wonderful Grand Band
 Los niños que escriben en el cielo – Spinetta Jade
 The Lounge Lizards – The Lounge Lizards
 Love Potion - Dr. John
 Lustwandel – Hans-Joachim Roedelius
 Macadam 3, 2, 1, 0 – Riff (banda)
 Magic Man – Herb Alpert
 Minor Threat – Minor Threat – EP
 Material – Moebius & Plank
 Mommy Don't Love Daddy Anymore – Resurrection Band
 Mondo Mando - David Grisman
 Never Say Die – Petra
 Odyshape – The Raincoats
 Penis Envy – Crass
 Peperina – Serú Girán
 Performance – Ashford & Simpson
 Place without a Postcard – Midnight Oil
 Play Me Out – Helen Reddy
 The Plimsouls – The Plimsouls
 Public Service (EP) – Various Artists
 The Punch Line – Minutemen
 Quiero Ser – Menudo
 Quit Dreaming and Get On the Beam – Bill Nelson
 Reflections – Gil Scott-Heron
 Rock 'n' Roll Warriors – Savoy Brown
 Ruedas de metal – Riff (banda)
 Secret Combination – Randy Crawford
 Selbstportrait – Hans-Joachim Roedelius
 Sky 3 – Sky
 Standing Together – Midnight Star
 Stick Figure Neighbourhood – Spoons
 Sub Pop 5 – Various Artists
 Sunrise in Different Dimensions – Sun Ra
 Thirsty Ears - Powder Blues Band
 Trio – Trio
 Wanna Be a Star – Chilliwack
 Wünsche fliegen übers Meer – Die Flippers
 Years Ago – The Statler Brothers
 You Must Believe in Spring – Bill Evans
 You're the Guy I Want to Share My Money With – Laurie Anderson, William S. Burroughs and John Giorno
 Youth of America – Wipers

Biggest hit singles
The following songs achieved the highest chart positions
in the charts of 1981.

Chronological table of US and UK Number One hit singles
US Number One singles and artist  (Weeks at Number One)

"(Just Like) Starting Over" – John Lennon (4 weeks)
"The Tide Is High" – Blondie (1)
"Celebration" – Kool & the Gang (2)
"9 to 5" – Dolly Parton (2)
"I Love a Rainy Night" – Eddie Rabbitt (2)
"Keep on Loving You" – REO Speedwagon (1)
"Rapture" – Blondie (2)
"Kiss On My List" – Daryl Hall & John Oates (3)
"Morning Train (9 to 5)" – Sheena Easton (2)
"Bette Davis Eyes" – Kim Carnes (9)
"Stars on 45 Medley" – Stars On 45 (1)
"The One That You Love" – Air Supply (1)
"Jessie's Girl" – Rick Springfield (2)
"Endless Love" – Diana Ross & Lionel Richie (9)
"Arthur's Theme (Best That You Can Do)" – Christopher Cross (3)
"Private Eyes" – Daryl Hall & John Oates (2)
"Physical" – Olivia Newton-John (6)

UK Number One singles and artist  (Weeks at Number One)

"There's No-one Quite Like Grandma" – St Winifred's School Choir (1)
"Imagine" – John Lennon (4)
"Woman" – John Lennon (2)
"Shaddup You Face" – Joe Dolce Music Theatre (3)
"Jealous Guy" – Roxy Music (2)
"This Ole House" – Shakin' Stevens (3)
"Making Your Mind Up" – Bucks Fizz (3)
"Stand and Deliver" – Adam and the Ants (5)
"Being With You" – Smokey Robinson (2)
"One Day in Your Life" – Michael Jackson (2)
"Ghost Town" – The Specials (3)
"Green Door"- Shakin' Stevens (4)
"Japanese Boy" – Aneka (1)
"Tainted Love" – Soft Cell (2)
"Prince Charming" – Adam and the Ants (4)
"It's My Party" – Dave Stewart (the keyboardist) & Barbara Gaskin (4)
"Every Little Thing She Does Is Magic" – The Police (1)
"Under Pressure" – Queen & David Bowie (2)
"Begin the Beguine" – Julio Iglesias (1)
"Don't You Want Me" – The Human League (3)

Chronological table of US and UK Number One hit albums
US Number One album and artist  (Weeks at Number One)

 Double Fantasy – John Lennon and Yoko Ono (7)
 Hi Infidelity  – REO Speedwagon (15)
  Paradise Theatre – Styx  (3)
 Mistaken Identity – Kim Carnes (4)
 Long Distance Voyager – The Moody Blues (3)
 Precious Time – Pat Benatar (1)
 4 – Foreigner (7)
 Bella Donna – Stevie Nicks (1)
 Escape – Journey (1)
 Tattoo You – The Rolling Stones (9)
 For Those About to Rock We Salute You – AC/DC (1)

UK Number One album and artist (Weeks at Number One)

Super Trouper – ABBA (3)
Kings of the Wild Frontier – Adam and the Ants (12)
Double Fantasy  – John Lennon & Yoko Ono (2)
 Face Value – Phil Collins (3)
 Stars on 45- Stars on 45 / Starsound (5)
 No Sleep 'til Hammersmith – Motörhead (1)
 Disco Daze and Disco Nites  – Various Artists (1)
 Love Songs – Cliff Richard (5)
 The Official BBC Album of the Royal Wedding – Various Artists (2)
 Time – Electric Light Orchestra (2)
 Dead Ringer – Meat Loaf (2)
 Abacab – Genesis (2)
 Ghost in the Machine – The Police (3)
 Dare – The Human League (1)
 Shaky – Shakin' Stevens (1)
 Greatest Hits – Queen (4)
Chart Hits '81 – Various Artists (1)
The Visitors – ABBA (3)

Top 40 Chart hit singles

Other Chart hit singles

Notable singles

Other Notable singles

Published popular music
 "9 To 5" w.m. Dolly Parton from the film Nine to Five
 "All Those Years Ago" w.m. George Harrison
 "Allentown" w.m. Billy Joel
 "Allergies" w.m. Paul Simon
 "America" w.m. Neil Diamond from the film The Jazz Singer
 "And I Am Telling You I'm Not Going" w. Tom Eyen m. Henry Krieger from the musical Dreamgirls
 "Arthur's Theme" w.m. Carole Bayer Sager, Burt Bacharach, Christopher Cross & Peter Allen from the film Arthur
 "At This Moment" w.m. Billy Vera
 "Baby, Come To Me" w.m. Rod Temperton
 "Being With You" w.m. William "Smokey" Robinson
 "Believe it or Not (Theme From The Greatest American Hero)" w. Stephen Geyer m. Mike Post
 "The Best of Times" w.m. Dennis DeYoung
 "Bette Davis Eyes" w. Donna Weiss m. Jackie DeShannon
 "Black Limousine" w.m. Mick Jagger, Keith Richards and Ronnie Wood
 "Bruce" w.m. Rick Springfield
 "Chariots of Fire" w. Jon Anderson m. Vangelis
 "Dynasty theme song" m. Bill Conti
 "The First Time it Happens" w.m. Joe Raposo, from the film The Great Muppet Caper
 "Good Thing Going (Going Gone)"     w.m. Stephen Sondheim
 "Hill Street Blues theme song" m. Mike Post
 "Key Largo"     w.m. Bertie Higgins & Sonny Limbo
 "Memory w. Trevor Nunn & T. S. Eliot m. Andrew Lloyd Webber.  Introduced by Elaine Paige in the musical Cats.
 "One of the Girls" w. Fred Ebb m. John Kander introduced by Lauren Bacall in the musical Woman of the Year

Classical music
 Milton Babbitt 
Don, for piano four-hands
Ars Combinatoria, for small orchestra
 Leonard Bernstein 
Olympic Hymn, chorus and orchestra
 Rob du Bois
String Quartet no. 3
Sonata for solo viola
 George Crumb – Gnomic Variations for piano
 Peter Maxwell Davies – Piano Sonata
 Joël-François Durand – String Trio
 Morton Feldman
 Bass Clarinet and Percussion, for bass clarinet, cymbals and gongs
 Triadic Memories, for piano
 For Aaron Copland, for violin
 Lorenzo Ferrero
 Balletto
 Arioso II
 Variazioni sulla notte, for guitar
 Cristóbal Halffter
 Fantasia sobre una sonoridad de G. F. Haendel, for string orchestra
 Ricercare, for organ
 Bengt Hambraeus – Voluntary on a Swedish Hymn Tune from Dalecarlia
 Wojciech Kilar – Exodus, a vocal-symphonic poem for mixed choir and orchestra
 George Lloyd – Tenth Symphony (for brass)
 Tome Mančev
 Symphonic Poem, for large orchestra, Op. 16
 Dance, for piano and percussion, Op. 19
 The Year 1014 , for mixed chorus, Op. 20
 March of the Bicyclists, for children's chorus
 Miroslav Miletić
 Sonatina for violin and guitar
 Sonata for viola and piano
 Three Popular Songs from Dalmatia for voice and guitar
 Steve Reich – Tehillim
 Roger Sessions – Concerto for Orchestra (recorded by Seiji Ozawa and the Boston Symphony Orchestra, and for which the composer receives the Pulitzer Prize for Music)
 Robert Simpson
 Quintet for clarinet and strings
 Symphony No. 8
 Stanislaw Skrowaczewski – Clarinet Concerto
 Alfred Schnittke
 Symphony No. 3
 Minnesang, for 52 voices
 String Quartet No. 2
 Karlheinz Stockhausen
Klavierstück XIII
Traum-Formel, for basset horn

Opera
 Lorenzo Ferrero – La figlia del mago
 Conrad Susa and Richard Street – Black River
 Karlheinz Stockhausen – Donnerstag aus Licht (March 15, La Scala, Milan, but without act 3, due to a choir strike; first full performance on April 3)

Jazz

Musical theater
 Barnum – London production opened at the London Palladium on June 11 and ran for 655 performances
 Bring Back Birdie –  Broadway production
 Cats (Andrew Lloyd Webber) – London production opened at the New London Theatre on May 11 and ran for 8949 performances
 Dreamgirls – Broadway production opened on December 20 at the Imperial Theatre and ran for 1522 performances
 March of the Falsettoes – off-Broadway production
 Merrily We Roll Along – Broadway production opened at the Alvin Theatre on November 16 and ran for 16 performances
 The Pirates of Penzance – Broadway revival
 Song and Dance – London production
 Woman of the Year – Broadway production opened at the Palace Theatre on March 29 and ran for 770 performances

Musical films
 Aakkramanam
 American Pop
 The Great Muppet Caper
 Heavy Metal
 Lili Marleen
 Nandu
 Pennies from Heaven
 Shock Treatment

Births
January 2 - JT Daly,  American indie rock musician, producer, songwriter, and visual artist (K Flay, Demi Lovato) 
January 4 – Silvy De Bie, Belgian singer 
January 5 – Carmen Monarcha, Brazilian operatic soprano
January 7 – Ania, Polish singer-songwriter and composer
January 15 
Howie Day, American singer-songwriter 
Pitbull, Cuban-American rapper
January 16 – Marta Roure, Andorran singer and actress
January 19 – Thaila Zucchi, British singer and actress (allSTARS*)
January 21 
 Andy Lee, South Korean singer and actor (Shinhwa)
 Floor Jansen, Dutch singer, songwriter, and vocal coach. 
January 22 – Willa Ford, American pop singer-songwriter, model, musician and actress
January 25 – Alicia Keys, American singer-songwriter, record producer, pianist, actress and activist
January 28 – Gen Hoshino, Japanese singer
January 29 – Jonny Lang, American blues artist
January 31 – Justin Timberlake, American singer (NSYNC), collaborator with Britney Spears (Married to Jessica Biel, Worked with JC Chasez) 
February 1 – Jay R Sillona, Filipino singer
February 3 - Micah P. Hinson  an American Americana singer and guitarist and recording artist 
February 5 – Zameer Rizvi, Canadian singer/songwriter, composer and record producer
February 9 
Tom Hiddleston, English actor, film producer and musician (Taylor Swift)
The Rev, American musician (Avenged Sevenfold) (d. 2009)
February 10 – Natasha St-Pier, Canadian singer
February 11 – Kelly Rowland American singer-songwriter, member of Destiny's Child
February 12 – Lisa Hannigan, Irish singer-songwriter, musician and voice actress.
February 15  
Matt Hoopes, musician, guitarist and singer-songwriter, (Relient K)
Olivia, American singer-songwriter and actress
February 17 – Paris Hilton, American singer-songwriter, DJ, YouTuber and writer (Friend of Britney Spears) 
February 18 – Kamasi Washington, American crossover jazz saxophonist
February 19 – Beth Ditto, American singer-songwriter, author, entrepreneur  (Gossip) 
February 26 – Sharon Van Etten, American singer-songwriter and actress
February 27 – Josh Groban, American crossover singer-songwriter
March 3
Tobias Forge, Swedish musician
Kim Yoo-jin, South Korean singer and actress
Shatha Hassoun, Iraqi singer
Cristina Scarlat, Moldovan singer  
March 7 – Anna Leese, New Zealand operatic soprano
March 9 – Chad Gilbert, American musician, singer-songwriter (New Found Glory)
March 11
Russell Lissack (Bloc Party)
LeToya Luckett (Destiny's Child)
 March 14 - Katarína Knechtová,  Slovak singer-songwriter and guitarist
March 20 – Declan Bennett, English singer-songwriter
March 26
Anaïs Mitchell, American singer-songwriter, producer and musician (Rachel Ries, Jefferson Hamer,  Ani DiFranco, Justin Vernon, Greg Brown and Ben Knox Miller)
Jay Sean, British singer-songwriter 
March 27 – JJ Lin, Singaporean singer
March 29 - Megan Hilty, American singer
April 1
Theresa Sokyrka, Canadian Idol 2 runner-up
Hannah Spearritt, English singer and actress (S Club 7)
April 2 – Raghav, Canadian singer  
April 5 – Mariqueen Maandig, a Filipino American musician and singer-songwriter. (How To Destroy Angels, West Indian Girl, Trent Reznor) 
April 6 – Aidonia, Jamaican dancehall artist
April 8 – Gummy, Korean singer
April 9 - Geneviève Castrée, a Canadian cartoonist, illustrator, and musician from Quebec. (D. 2016) (Married to Phil Elverum)
April 10 – Laura Bell Bundy, American actress and singer
April 12 – Fahad Al Kubaisi, Qatari singer and activist
April 17 – Hanna Pakarinen, Finnish singer
April 27 – Sandy Mölling, German pop singer  
April 29 – Tom Smith (Editors)
April 30 – Justin Vernon, American multi-instrumentalist, singer-songwriter and producer (Bon Iver, Taylor Swift's Folklore and Evermore) 
May 3 
Farrah Franklin, American singer-songwriter, actress (Destiny's Child)
Josh Tillman, American singer-songwriter, guitarist, drummer and record producer
May 4, Dallon Weekes, American singer, songwriter, musician and producer (Of Bands: Panic! At The Disco, & I Dont Know How But They Found Me
May 5 
Jesse Colburn, Canadian guitarist and songwriter 
Craig David, British singer-songwriter, rapper and record producer
 May 10 - Tom Vek,  English indie self-taught multi-instrumentalist musician
May 12 – Hannah Ild, Estonian singer-songwriter and pianist
May 13 - Mozella, American songwriter and singer
May 16 - Brooke McClymont, Australian singer-songwriter, musician and guitarist (sister of Samantha McClymont) 
May 20 
Sean Conlon, English pop singer (5ive)
Rachel Platten, American singer-songwriter
May 21 – Stig van Eijk, singer, composer and lyricist
May 23 
Dessa, American rapper, singer, spoken word artist, writer and record executive
Pierre Lapointe, Canadian singer-songwriter and keyboard player 
Gwenno Saunders, Welsh singer and dancer (The Pipettes)
May 25 - Autumn Rowe, American singer-songwriter, TV personality, DJ and activist 
May 30 – Devendra Banhart, Venezuelan American singer-songwriter and visual artist
June 1 – Brandi Carlile, American folk rock and Americana singer-songwriter
June 2 
Brandon Jenner, indie pop musician (Brandon & Leah)
Catherine Manoukian, Canadian violinist
June 7 – Dave Catching, American guitarist, songwriter and producer (Earthlings? and Mondo Generator)
June 8 – Alex Band, American rock singer-songwriter (The Calling)
June 9  
 Vic Chou, Taiwanese actor, singer and model
Anoushka Shankar, British Indian sitar player
June 10 – Hoku Ho, Hawaiian singer and musician  
June 15 – Billy Martin (guitarist), American guitarist
June 17 – Ken the 390, Japanese rapper
June 20 – Alisan Porter,  American singer, winner of season 10 of The Voice (US)
June 21 – Brandon Flowers, American singer-songwriter, musician, Multi-instrumentalist, advocate, member of (The Killers)
June 23
Mikey Bustos, Filipino-Canadian singer and entertainer
Antony Costa (Blue)
Shi Xin Hui, Malaysian singer
June 28 
Michael Crafter, Australian singer-songwriter (Confession, I Killed the Prom Queen, Carpathian and Bury Your Dead)
Savage (AKA Demetrius Savelio) New Zealand born Samoan rapper
July 1 – Clemency Burton-Hill, English classical music broadcast presenter
July 3 – Hayley Holt, New Zealand snowboarder, host and ballroom dancer 
July 6 – Emily West, American singer-songwriter and guitarist
July 7 – Synyster Gates, American musician (Avenged Sevenfold)
July 8 
 Oka Antara, Indonesian rapper and actor 
 Dagmar Oja, Estonian singer 
July 12
 Rebecca Hunter, English pop singer (allSTARS*) and actress
 Maya Sar, Bosnian singer
July 14 – Milow, Belgian singer-songwriter 
July 15 – OC Ukeje, Nigerian actor, model and musician 
July 20
 Lowkey, American rapper and producer
 Dayang Nurfaizah, Malaysian singer  
July 21 
Paloma Faith, English singer-songwriter
Blake Lewis, American Idol 6 runner-up
Claudette Ortiz, American singer and model (City High)
July 22 – Anthony Santos, American singer-songwriter and composer
July 25 – Kizito Mihigo, Rwandan gospel singer, organist and peace activist (d. 2020)
July 31 
 Mesut Kurtis, British Turkish Islamic singer
 Ira Losco, Maltese singer
 M. Shadows, American singer-songwriter and musician (Avenged Sevenfold)
August 1 – Vaiko Eplik, Estonian singer-songwriter
August 3 - Scroobius Pip,  English actor and podcaster as well as a spoken word poet and hip hop recording artist from Stanford-le-Hope, Essex. (Dan le Sac Vs Scroobius Pip) 
August 4 – Florian Silbereisen, German singer and television presenter
August 5 – Ko Shibasaki, Japanese singer and actress  
August 6 – Leslie Odom Jr., American singer and actor 
August 8
Vanessa Amorosi, Australian singer-songwriter, musician, guitarist and rock star (Dave Stewart) 
Bradley McIntosh, English pop singer (S Club 7)
Kaori Iida, Japanese singer and actress  
August 11 – Sandi Thom, Scottish singer-songwriter and multi-instrumentalist
August 24 – Jiro Wang, Taiwanese actor and singer (Fahrenheit) 
August 28 – Iracema Trevisan (Cansei de Ser Sexy)
September 4 
Beyoncé, American singer-songwriter, dancer and actress   
Lacey Sturm, American singer-songwriter (Flyleaf)
September 6 – Yumiko Cheng, Hong Kong singer 
September 7 – Do, Dutch singer
September 14 – Ashley Roberts American singer-songwriter, dancer, choreographer, actress, model, presenter and television personality (The Pussycat Dolls)
September 16 – Nazril Irham, Indonesian singer  
September 18 – Jesse Frasure, American music publisher, record producer, songwriter and DJ
September 25 – Perfume Genius, American indie EDM musician, singer-songwriter and artist
September 26 
 Christina Milian, American singer-songwriter, dancer and actress
 Aras Baskauskas, Yogi, musician and reality tv personality, worked musically under name: Odd Us
September 29 – Suzanne Shaw, English singer (Hear'Say) and actress
October 1 – Jamelia, British singer-songwriter
October 5 – Breakbot, producer and DJ
October 8 – Ruby, Egyptian singer
October 10 – Una Healy, Irish singer (The Saturdays)
October 13 
 Doveman, American singer, pianist and producer
 Kele Okereke, Kele, English musician (Bloc Party)
October 14 – Ruslan Alekhno, Russian-Belarusian singer
October 15 – Nick White (Tilly and the Wall)
October 19 – Christian Bautista, Filipino singer, actor, host and model
October 25 – Josh Henderson, American actor, singer and model
October 29 – Angelika Dela Cruz, Filipina actress and singer
October 31 – Frank Iero, American rock guitarist (My Chemical Romance)
November 1 
Tommy Karevik,  Swedish metal vocalist (Kamelot, Seventh Wonder, Ayreon)
LaTavia Roberson, American R&B singer-songwriter (Destiny's Child)
November 2 - Ai (singer),  a Japanese-American singer-songwriter, rapper, record producer, spokeswoman, and actress.
November 7 – Krystal Harris, American singer-songwriter 
November 13 – Shawn Yue, Hong Kong actor and singer
November 16 – Kate Miller-Heidke, Australian crossover singer-songwriter and actress
November 17 – Sarah Harding, English pop singer-songwriter, dancer, model and actress (Girls Aloud) (d. 2021)
November 20 
Scott Hutchison, Scottish singer-songwriter, guitarist and artist (d. 2018)
Kimberley Walsh, English pop singer-songwriter (Girls Aloud)
November 22 
Ben Adams, English pop singer-songwriter (A1)
Jenny Owen Youngs, American singer-songwriter  
November 26 – Natasha Bedingfield, English singer-songwriter
November 30 – Mavado, Jamaican deejay and singer-songwriter
December 2 – Britney Spears, American singer-songwriter, dancer, performer, musician, author, activist, advocate, businesswoman, and clothes designer
December 9 – Camoflauge, American rapper (d. 2003)
December 11 – Zacky Vengeance, heavy metal rhythm guitarist and backing vocalist (Avenged Sevenfold)
December 13
Gary Innes, Scottish accordionist, shinty player and broadcaster
Amy Lee, American singer-songwriter, harpist, pianist, musician, multi instrumentalist and activist (Evanescence)
December 16 
Gaby Moreno, Guatemalan singer
Krysten Ritter, American musician and actress
December 17
 Wacław Kiełtyka, Polish musician and composer
 Houari Manar, Algerian raï singer (d. 2019)
December 21 – Lynda Thomas, Mexican musician, singer-songwriter, eurodance and alternative rock musician
December 23 – Beth, Spanish singer and actress
December 28 – Frank Turner, English punk and folk singer-songwriter

Deaths
January 1 – Hephzibah Menuhin, pianist and human rights campaigner, 60
January 4 – Ruth Lowe, pianist and songwriter, 66
January 23 – Samuel Barber, composer, 70
January 25 – Adele Astaire, US dancer, actress and singer, 84
February 1
Frank Merrick, pianist
Geirr Tveitt, Norwegian composer, 72
Ernst Pepping, composer, 79
February 9 – Bill Haley, rock and roll pioneer, 55 (heart attack)
February 15 
Mike Bloomfield, blues guitarist, 37 (accidental drug overdose)
Karl Richter, German organist and conductor, 54
February 19 – Olive Gilbert, actress and singer, 82
February 21 – Ron Grainer, electronic music pioneer and composer, 58
February 26 – Howard Hanson, composer, 84
April 5
Bob Hite, vocalist (Canned Heat), 38 (heart attack)
Maurice Zbriger, violinist, composer and conductor
April 7 – Kit Lambert, former manager and producer of The Who, 45 (fell downstairs)
April 8 – Burt Shevelove, librettist, 66
April 14 – Ivan Galamian, violin teacher, 78
April 28 – Steve Currie, bassist of T.Rex, 33 (car crash)
May 11 – Bob Marley, reggae musician, 36 (cancer)
May 25 – Roy Brown, blues singer, 55
May 28 – Mary Lou Williams, jazz pianist, 71
July 1 – Rushton Moreve, US bass player and songwriter (Steppenwolf), 32
July 16 – Harry Chapin, US singer-songwriter, 38 (car crash)
August 18 – Robert Russell Bennett, composer and arranger, 87
August 26 – Lee Hays, folk singer, 67
September 2 – Tadeusz Baird, composer, 53
September 8 – Master Venu, film composer, 65
September 14 – Furry Lewis, country blues guitarist and songwriter, 88
September 15 – Chick Bullock, US singer, 72
September 22 – Henry Warren, film songwriter, 87
October 2 – Hazel Scott, classical pianist and singer, 61
October 5 – Sven Gyldmark, film composer, 77
October 13 – Marius Casadesus, violinist and composer, 88
October 15 – Elsie Randolph, English actress, dancer and singer, 77
October 29 – Georges Brassens, singer-songwriter, 60
November 27 – Lotte Lenya, actress and singer, wife of Kurt Weill, 83
December 13 – Cornelius Cardew, avant-garde composer, 45 (road accident)
December 27 – Hoagy Carmichael, pianist, singer and songwriter, 82

Awards

Grammy Awards
 Grammy Awards of 1981

Country Music Association Awards
 1981 Country Music Association Awards

Eurovision Song Contest
 Eurovision Song Contest 1981

Charts

List of No. 1 Hits
 List of Billboard Hot 100 number-one singles of 1981

See also

 Timeline of musical events

References

 
20th century in music
Music by year